Moș Gerilă is the name of a character from Romanian folklore and communist propaganda.

Origin of the name 
The Romanian word moș means an elder male person. The term ger means "frost" in Romanian.
Moș Gerilă's name is a translation of the Russian Ded Moroz and was adopted by the Romanian communists, under influence of the Soviet model, as a new name for Moș Crăciun (Santa Claus).

Appearance 
In 1947, the newspaper Națiunea published an illustration of Moș Gerilă as a young, athletic, proletarian, bare-chested man.

History of the character

Origins
During the period from 1944 to 1948, Romanian Communist Party newspapers tried to denigrate the image of Christmas, emphasizing, for example, the peasant origins of many colinde.

In 1948, after the Communists took power in Romania, the word Crăciun ceased to appear in any article in the newspaper Scînteia.

The word Crăciun was considered too religious, and therefore instead of Moș Crăciun, (the Romanian name for Santa Claus), a new character was introduced in the 1950s: Moș Gerilă. Children were told that it was Moș Gerilă who brought gifts each December 25.

In the three years following the installation of the Communists in power, Christmas celebrations were transferred to the New Year, December 30, the day when King Michael of Romania abdicated in 1947, was renamed the Day of the Republic. December 25 and 26 became working days.

Decline 
In the 1980s, the personality cult of "the beloved leader" would leave its imprint on the character of Moș Gerilă. Children's New Year gifts were associated less with Moș Gerilă and more with the state itself, personified by Nicolae Ceaușescu.

After the Romanian Revolution of 1989, Moș Gerilă lost influence and the older character of Moș Crăciun returned.

See also

Notes and references

Fictional characters introduced in the 1940s
Christmas in Romania
Christmas characters
Romanian mythology
Socialist Republic of Romania
Christmas gift-bringers